Mirahmetjan Muzepper (born 14 January 1991 in Kashgar), also known as Metjan, is a Chinese professional footballer of Uyghur ethnicity who currently plays for Chinese Super League club Shanghai Port. He became the first Uyghur player to play for the Chinese national football team in 2018.

Club career
Mirahmetjan Muzepper grew up from a football family with his father Muzepper and grandfather Zunun Mamut both playing within the Xinjiang region. At a young age he would quickly draw the attentions of Shandong Luneng and join their youth team where he would win several youth championships, which attracted the interests of Henan Construction who took him on loan at the beginning of the 2010 Chinese Super League season where he would make his senior debut in a league game against Jiangsu Sainty on April 18, 2010 that was a 0-0 draw. 

After a productive season where Mirahmetjan established himself as a regular for Henan he would return to Shandong at the beginning of the 2011 Chinese Super League and would go on to make his first senior appearance for the club in a league game against Chengdu Blades on April 1, 2011 as a substitute Wang Yongpo in a 3-3 draw.

On 5 January 2014, Mirahmetjan transferred to fellow Chinese Super League side Henan Jianye on a free transfer. On 31 December 2016, Henan Jianye officially confirmed that Muzepper had left the club after a disagreement in negotiations for extending his contract.

On 9 January 2017, Mirahmetjan moved to Super League side Tianjin TEDA.

In January 2020, Mirahmetjan transferred to Super League side Shanghai SIPG.

International career
Mirahmetjan was called up into China U-20's squad in 2009 where he would take part in the teams 2010 AFC U-19 Championship qualification. After China's successful qualification he would  draw significant attention when he became the first Uyghur player to ever be called up to the senior team. The Chinese Head coach Gao Hongbo called him up for several training sessions in preparation for 2010 East Asian Football Championship on the basis of his youth performances, however he did not feature within the tournament. He would return to the Chinese U-20 squad and take part in the 2010 AFC U-19 Championship where he would play in three games and saw China knocked out quarter-finals. After that tournament he was immediately promoted to the Chinese U-23 squad and included in the team that played in the Football at the 2010 Asian Games where he would once more play in three games and see China knocked out in the last sixteen. On 7 September 2018, he made his debut for Chinese national team in a 1–0 away defeat against Qatar, coming on for Gao Lin in the 74th minute, which made him the first Uyghur player to appear for the Chinese national team.

Career statistics

Club statistics 
Statistics accurate as of match played 4 January 2022.

International statistics

References

External links
Player stats at Sohu.com
 

1991 births
Living people
Chinese footballers
Uyghur sportspeople
Chinese people of Uyghur descent 
Footballers from Xinjiang
Shandong Taishan F.C. players
Henan Songshan Longmen F.C. players
Tianjin Jinmen Tiger F.C. players
Shanghai Port F.C. players
Chinese Super League players
People from Kashgar
Association football fullbacks
Association football midfielders
Footballers at the 2010 Asian Games
China international footballers
Asian Games competitors for China